Andreas Bummel (*9. February 1976 in Cape Town) is co-founder and Director of Democracy Without Borders and of the international campaign for a United Nations Parliamentary Assembly.

From 1998 to 2008 he was coordinator for UN reform issues of the Society for Threatened Peoples, one of Germany’s leading human rights organizations and since 1998 he is a member of the Council of the World Federalist Movement-Institute for Global Policy in New York.

In 2012, he was elected as a fellow by the World Academy of Art and Science in recognition of his work on a world parliament and in 2015 the Society for Threatened Peoples awarded him the association’s honorary membership.

A submission he made was a semi-finalist in the New Shape Prize in 2016 of the Global Challenges Foundation

In 2018, he authored a major book on the history, relevance and implementation of a world parliament (with co-author Jo Leinen) titled "A World Parliament: Governance and Democracy in the 21st Century".

Publications include 

 Toward Global Political Integration: Time for a World Parliamentary Assembly, Great Transition Initiative, August 2016 
 A World Parliament and the Transition from International Law to World Law, Cadmus Journal, Vol. 2, no. 3, October 2014
 A United Nations Parliamentary Assembly: A policy review of Democracy Without Borders, 2020

References 

1976 births
Living people